Ivan Yevgenyevich Novoseltsev (born 25 August 1991) is a Russian former professional football player who played as a centre-back.

Club career
In January 2015, Novoseltsev signed for FC Rostov.

On 31 August 2016, Novoseltsev moved to FC Zenit Saint Petersburg.

On 31 January 2018, Novoseltsev joined FC Arsenal Tula on loan until the end of the 2017–18 season.

On 27 July 2018, Novoseltsev joined Anzhi Makhachkala on loan until January 2019.

On 29 January 2019, Novoseltsev joined Rostov on loan until the end of the season.

On 2 July 2019, he left Zenit for PFC Sochi.

On 2 July 2021, he returned to Arsenal Tula. On 12 April 2022, Novoseltsev terminated his contract with Arsenal. He announced his retirement from playing on 13 March 2023.

International career
Novoseltsev made his debut for the Russia national football team on 31 March 2015 in a friendly game against Kazakhstan.

Career statistics

Club

Notes

References

External links
 
 

1991 births
Footballers from Moscow
Living people
Russian footballers
Russia international footballers
Association football defenders
FC Khimki players
FC Torpedo Moscow players
FC Rostov players
FC Zenit Saint Petersburg players
FC Arsenal Tula players
FC Anzhi Makhachkala players
PFC Sochi players
Russian Premier League players
Russian First League players
Russian Second League players